(born 2 April 1977) is a Japanese former long-distance runner. She was a member of DEODEO Athletic Club for Women. She represented her country at the 2002 Asian Games and placed fourth in the women's 10,000 metres. As part of the Japanese national marathon relay team, she was winner of the Yokohama International Women's Ekiden in 1999 and 2000, and was the Beijing International Ekiden champion in 2001. She competed at the IAAF World Half Marathon Championships on three occasions and was part of Japan's silver medal-winning women's team in both 2001 and 2003. Kotorida was a silver medallist in the half marathon at the 2001 East Asian Games.

Competition record

References

1977 births
Living people
Japanese female long-distance runners
Sportspeople from Hiroshima
Athletes (track and field) at the 2002 Asian Games
Asian Games competitors for Japan